Gülen Gözler ("Laughing Eyes") is a 1977 Turkish comedy film directed by Ertem Eğilmez.

Plot
Yaşar and his wife Nezaket have kept on producing children in the hope of finally getting a male child. But they end up with only daughters instead (who they give masculine names). Now they are stuck with the task of arranging suitable rich husbands for them.

Cast
Münir Özkul (Yaşar)
Adile Naşit (Nezaket)
Müjde Ar (İsmet)
Itır Esen (Nedret)
Şener Şen (Vecihi)
Ayşen Gruda (Fikret)
Halit Akçatepe (Dursun)
Mahmut Hekimoğlu (Temel)
Şevket Altuğ (Laz Şevket)
Lale Ilgaz (Hasret)
Nejat Gürçen (Yunus)
Sevda Aktolga (Hikmet)
Ahmet Sezerel (Orhan)
Tuncay Akça (Tuncay)
İhsan Yüce (Hasan)

References

External links

1977 films
1970s Turkish-language films
1977 comedy films
Films set in Turkey
Turkish comedy films